John William "Red" Patterson (born May 11, 1987) is an American former professional baseball pitcher. He pitched in one Major League Baseball (MLB) game for the Los Angeles Dodgers in 2014 before his career was derailed by injury.

Career
Patterson attended Southwestern Oklahoma State University and was drafted by the Dodgers in the 29th round of the 2010 MLB Draft. He began his career with the Ogden Raptors in 2010, where he was 6-1 with a 
3.33 ERA in 14 starts. He split 2011 between the Great Lakes Loons and the Rancho Cucamonga Quakes and was 12-5 with a 3.69 ERA in 28 starts between the two levels.

Patterson was promoted to the AA Chattanooga Lookouts in 2012, where he was moved to the bullpen and made 47 appearances, with a 7-1 record and 3.07 ERA. In 2013, with the AAA Albuquerque Isotopes, he was in 39 games (with 12 starts) and was 7-4 with a 3.03 ERA.

He was a non-roster invitee to Major League spring training in 2014. After beginning the season with the Isotopes, the Dodgers purchased his contract and called him up to make his Major League debut in the second game of a doubleheader on May 1, 2014 against the Minnesota Twins. In that game he pitched 4 2/3 innings and only allowed two hits and one run and strike out Pedro Florimon swinging for his only major league K.

Patterson spent the rest of 2014 in the minors, where he made 20 starts for the Isotopes (and 9 relief appearances). He finished with a 5-8 record and 5.79 ERA. He was designated for assignment on September 12, 2014. Patterson underwent Tommy John surgery following the season and would spend all of 2015 in rehab. He was assigned to the Double-A Tulsa Drillers of the Texas League to begin his comeback attempt in 2016. He did not pitch for the Drillers, but allowed three runs in three innings in two games for the AAA Oklahoma City Dodgers and was released on May 6, 2016.

References

External links

1987 births
Living people
Albuquerque Isotopes players
Cardenales de Lara players
American expatriate baseball players in Venezuela
Chattanooga Lookouts players
Great Lakes Loons players
Los Angeles Dodgers players
Major League Baseball pitchers
Mesa Solar Sox players
Ogden Raptors players
Oklahoma City Dodgers players
People from McKinney, Texas 
Rancho Cucamonga Quakes players
Southwestern Oklahoma State Bulldogs baseball players
Anchorage Bucs players